"Should I Laugh or Cry" is a song by Swedish pop group ABBA, released as the B-side to the 1981 singles "One of Us" and "When All Is Said and Done" for the album The Visitors. Lead vocals were handled by Anni-Frid Lyngstad. It first appeared on the 1983 compilation album Thank You for the Music.

Synopsis
ABBA - Uncensored on the Record says "Should I Laugh or Cry" is "a rather bitter song" about the end of a relationship. ABBA: Let the Music Speak explains it as "reflect[ing] a failing relationship's preemptive strikes of anger and contemplation". The narrator is the "emotionally afflicted party", both "volatile and pitiless" in the verses yet "tender and forgiving" in the choruses. There is a sense that this is the last time the narrator will put up with this situation.

Composition

The chorus harmonies are "intricate" and "close-knit". Agnetha's "dreamy echo vocal" adds a sense of sadness to Frida's "fiery sentiments". The song has "deep percusive strikes" and also a "defiant electric glissando" in the verses, and a "lilting acoustic" in the chorus.

Release
While originally recorded on 4 September 1981 during sessions for the album The Visitors, "Should I Laugh or Cry" was ultimately not included. However, the song is included on Thank You for the Music (1983) and as a bonus track on remastered reissues of The Visitors.

References

ABBA songs
1981 songs